The 2005 Toronto Argonauts season was the 48th season for the team in the Canadian Football League and 133rd season overall. The Argonauts finished the regular season 11–7 and finished in first place in the East Division.

Offseason

CFL draft

Preseason

Regular season

Season schedule

Season standings

Postseason

Awards and records
Damon Allen, CFL Outstanding Player Award
Michael Fletcher, James P. McCaffrey Trophy

CFL All-Stars: Offence
QB – Damon Allen

CFL All-Stars: Defence
DE – Jonathan Brown
LB – Michael Fletcher
LB – Kevin Eiben
CB – Jordan Younger

CFL Eastern All-Stars: Offence
QB – Damon Allen
SB – Arland Bruce III
OG – Jude St. John
OT – Bernard Williams

CFL Eastern All-Stars: Defence
DE – Jonathan Brown
LB – Michael Fletcher
LB – Kevin Eiben
CB – Adrion Smith
CB – Jordan Younger
DB – Kenny Wheaton

CFL Eastern All-Stars: Special teams
P – Noel Prefontaine
K – Noel Prefontaine

References

Toronto Argonauts
Toronto Argonauts seasons